Amminadab (Aminadav, lit. My nation is generous) may refer to:

People
 Amminadab (Biblical person), one of the ancestors of King David
 Izhar, who was also known as Amminadab
 Amminadab I of Ammon, king of Ammon in the mid-seventh century B.C.
 Amminadab II of Ammon, his grandson
 Amminadab Lévinas, the son of Emmanuel Lévinas
 Aminadab, a figure in the Book of Mormon
 Aminadab, the assistant to Aylmer in Nathaniel Hawthorne's short story "The Birth-Mark"

Other
 Amminadab (novel), a book published in 1942 by the French writer and philosopher Maurice Blanchot
 Aminadav, a moshav in the Jerusalem region founded in 1950
 Ya'ar Aminadav, a forest in the Jerusalem Hills near Yad Kennedy that is a popular location for family outings, with picnic facilities and a marked, disability-friendly hiking trail